Hugh Auchincloss, Jr., is an American immunologist and physician serving as the acting director of the National Institute of Allergy and Infectious Diseases since 2023. He previously served as the principal deputy director between 2006 and 2022. He was previously a transplant surgeon and professor of surgery at Harvard Medical School, and researched at Massachusetts General Hospital for 17 years.

Early life and education 
Hugh Auchincloss, Jr., was born to Hugh Auchincloss, Sr. (1915−1998), and Katharine Lawrence Bundy. His mother was the daughter of lawyer Harvey Hollister Bundy, and the granddaughter of banker William Lowell Putnam. Auchincloss, Sr., was a long-time surgeon at Columbia University and The Valley Hospital. His father is the first cousin once-removed of stockbroker Hugh D. Auchincloss.

Auchincloss, Jr., graduated from Groton School. At Yale University, he completed an A.B. magna cum laude in political science and economics in 1972, and a master's degree in economics. Auchincloss graduated with Phi Beta Kappa honors. He completed his M.D. from Harvard Medical School in 1976.

Career 
Auchincloss was a transplant surgeon and professor of surgery at Harvard Medical School. For more than 17 years he operated a laboratory in transplantation immunology at Massachusetts General Hospital. In 1998, he founded the Juvenile Diabetes Research Foundation Center for Islet Transplantation and served as its director until 2003. He subsequently served as chief operating officer of the NIAID Immune Tolerance Network.

In 2006, he joined the National Institute of Allergy and Infectious Diseases (NIAID) as the principal deputy director. He led the development of the Institute's strategic plan and chaired the NIAID Research Initiative Committee, an internal governance group that has designed and implemented a more efficient approach to planning, developing, and approving NIAID initiatives. Auchincloss is oversees an NIAID initiative to design and implement changes in the Institute's clinical research infrastructure, which will be flexible and available for domestic and international clinical research on HIV/AIDS and other infectious diseases. Auchincloss is part of an NIAID senior leadership group responsible for reviewing all aspects of HIV/AIDS research policy, including the evaluation of “test and treat” strategies, analysis of results of pre-exposure prophylaxis (PrEP) clinical trials (including microbicide trials), and coordination of future HIV/AIDS vaccine clinical trials.

In 2005, Auchincloss was elected president of the American Society of Transplantation. He has authored scientific articles and texts and serves on the editorial boards of scientific publications. Auchincloss is on federal and NIH-wide committees, including the Trans-Federal Task Force on Optimizing Biocontainment Oversight, the National Security Strategy/Office of Science and Technology Policy on Optimizing Biological Select Agents and Toxins Working Group, and the National Biodefense Science Board. He was appointed as co-chair of the International Clinical Research Subcommittee of the NIH Global Health Research Working Group and as a member of the NIH Institute and Center Directors Clinical and Translational Science Awards Advisory Board. He also serves as the NIH point of contact for the Emergency Use Authorization program.

In January 2023, Auchincloss succeeded Anthony Fauci as the acting NIAID director.

Personal life 
On August 26, 1973, Auchincloss married Laurie Glimcher, a fellow Harvard Medical School student, at the Memorial Church of Harvard University. Before their divorce, they had 3 children including politician Jake Auchincloss.

References 

Year of birth missing (living people)
Living people
American immunologists
Groton School alumni
20th-century American physicians
20th-century American scientists
21st-century American physicians
21st-century American scientists
Harvard Medical School alumni
Harvard Medical School faculty
Yale College alumni
Massachusetts General Hospital faculty
National Institutes of Health people
HIV/AIDS researchers
American medical researchers
American transplant surgeons
Auchincloss family
Physician-scientists